The Robert Wan Pearl Museum is the world's only museum dedicated to pearls. It is in Papeete, Tahiti, the capital of French Polynesia.

Overview
The Pearl Museum recounts the history of the pearl throughout the world, the fascination it aroused in important persons, the legends, the habits, and the technical sides of perliculture. Robert Wan's private collection is on exhibit, featuring the largest Tahitian pearl in the world.

External links
 Robert Wan
 http://robertwan.com/

Pearls
Museums in Tahiti
Wan, Robert, Pearl Museum
Papeete